Petrocelli is a surname. Notable people with the surname include:

 Achille Petrocelli (c. 1861–1896), Italian painter
 Antonio Petrocelli (born 1953), American actor, comedian and writer
 Arturo Petrocelli (1856–after 1916), Italian painter
 Daniel M. Petrocelli (born 1953),  American defense attorney
 Rico Petrocelli (born 1943), American former Major League Baseball shortstop and third baseman
 Vincenzo Petrocelli (1825–1896), Italian painter

Television 
 Petrocelli,  1970s American television series
 Petrucelli, surname

Italian-language surnames